"Lass die Sonne rein" ("Let the Sun In") is a song by the German hip hop group Die Fantastischen Vier. It was released in 1993 from the album 4 gewinnt.

Track listing 
 "Lass' die Sonne rein" (4:09)
 "Es wird Regen geben (Remix)" (4:25)
 "Nur ein Traum" (4:20)

Charts

External links
 
 

1993 singles
Die Fantastischen Vier songs
Songs written by Thomas D
1992 songs
Columbia Records singles
German-language songs